Eduardo Saul Schwartz (born 1940) is a professor of finance at SFU's Beedie School of Business, where he holds the Ryan Beedie Chair in Finance. He is also a Distinguished Research Professor at the University of California, Los Angeles. He is known for pioneering research in several areas of finance, particularly derivatives. His major contributions include: the real options method of pricing investments under uncertainty; the Longstaff–Schwartz model -  a multi-factor short-rate model; the Longstaff-Schwartz method for valuing American options by Monte Carlo Simulation;  the use of Finite difference methods for option pricing.

He has been faculty at the University of British Columbia and UCLA, and visiting at the London Business School, the University of California, Berkeley and the Universidad Carlos III in Madrid.  His wide-ranging research has focused on different dimensions in asset and securities pricing.  Topics in recent years include interest rate models, asset allocation issues, evaluating natural resource investments, pricing Internet companies, the stochastic behaviour of commodity prices, valuing patent-protected R&D projects and optimal carbon abatement strategies.  

He has published more than 100 articles in finance and economics journals and with Lenos Trigeorgis is an author of Real Options and Investment Under Uncertainty. He is the winner of a number of awards for both teaching excellence and for the quality of his published work. He has served as associate editor for over 20 journals, including Journal of Finance, Journal of Financial Economics and Journal of Financial and Quantitative Analysis. He is a past president of the Western Finance Association and the American Finance Association. He is a fellow of the American Finance Association and the Financial Management Association International. He is a research associate of the National Bureau of Economic Research. 

He was awarded a Doctor Honoris Causa by the University of Alicante in Spain and by the Copenhagen Business School in Denmark, and a Catedra de Excelencia by the Universidad Carlos III in Madrid. He has also been a consultant to governmental agencies, banks, investment banks and industrial corporations.

Professor Schwartz received a B.Eng. (1963) in Industrial Engineering from the University of Chile, and an M.Sc. (1973) and Ph.D. (1975; supervisor: Michael Brennan) both in business administration from the University of British Columbia.

References

External links
 SFU's Beedie School of Business
 SFU Beedie faculty profile
 Home page at UCLA.
 Curriculum Vitae
 SSRN Author Page
 "Real Options and Investment under Uncertainty"
 

Living people
Financial economists
20th-century Chilean economists
UCLA Anderson School of Management faculty
UBC Sauder School of Business alumni
University of Chile alumni
Real options
Monte Carlo methodologists
1940 births
National Bureau of Economic Research
Chilean expatriates in Canada
Chilean expatriates in the United States
Presidents of the American Finance Association
21st-century Chilean economists